Johannes Schultz may refer to:

 Johannes Schultz (composer) (1582–1653), German composer
 Johannes Heinrich Schultz (1884–1970), German psychiatrist and an independent psychotherapist